Chicks to Chicks is a Philippine television sitcom that aired on IBC from 1979 to 1987 and ABS-CBN (retitled as Chika Chika Chicks) from 1987 to 1991. The sitcom is about a married couple who lived with a bevy of stunning and sexy models in their house as boarders. It chronicled the day-to-day activities of a middle-class family with their dreams, ambitions and values. The sitcom is best known for inventing the Filipino term manyakis (manyak sa kiss, Filipino slang for "kissing maniac") by Chito Arceo's character, Chiqui.

Cast
Chicks to Chicks:
Nova Villa as Ines Sales Capistrano
Freddie Webb as Jimmy Capistrano 		
Chito Arceo as Chiqui Sales
Ruby Anna as Mary Ann	
Maria Teresa Carlson as Marites		
Malou dela Fuente as Malou
Carmi Martin as Carmi
Lorraine Schuck
Chuchi as Lola
Lourdes Nuqui as Dina Valle

Chika Chika Chicks:
Nova Villa as Ines Sales Capistrano
Freddie Webb as Jimmy Capistrano 			
Chuchi (credited as Chuchi Hernandez) as Lola
Carmi Martin as Carmi
Sheila Ysrael as Sheila
Bong Dimayacyac 
Sammy Lagmay as Sammy
Lorraine Schuck
Noche Sumayao as Strawberry
Marilou Sadiwa (credited as Marilou Sadiua)
Dolly Duran
Lourdes Nuqui as Dina Valle

Re-run
The ABS-CBN era series Chika Chika Chicks was first re-aired through Kapamilya Channel (now ABS-CBN Sports And Action) from 2007 to 2009 and currently on Jeepney TV.

The IBC era series Chicks to Chicks will be re-aired on IBC 13 in 2019. However, there is no showing of the IBC-13 episodes as of 2020.

See also
List of programs previously broadcast by Intercontinental Broadcasting Corporation
List of programs broadcast by ABS-CBN

References

External links

ABS-CBN original programming
Filipino-language television shows
Intercontinental Broadcasting Corporation original programming
Philippine television sitcoms
1970s Philippine television series
1980s Philippine television series
1990s Philippine television series
1979 Philippine television series debuts
1991 Philippine television series endings